Garsfontein is a residential suburb of the city of Pretoria in the Gauteng province of South Africa. It is a well-developed area, lying to the east of the city centre, close to the Menlyn Park shopping center.

Education
Garsfontein is served by Laerskool Garsfontein a public elementary school and Hoërskool Garsfontein a public high school, both of which are primarily Afrikaans speaking schools.

Points of interest
 Zita Park is public park which is frequented by families and children, it has well maintained facilities including a paddling pool, water slide, playground equipment, ablution facilities and a tuck shop. According to an article in Pretoria News on August 10, 2006 the park was established on the location of a cemetery for the black community formerly living there. The Eastwood Location was established as a black community on 1905, but under the proclamation of the Group Areas Act of 1950 the area was designated as a white area and resulted in the removal of the black residents.

References

Suburbs of Pretoria